Spooky or Spookey may refer to:
 something that will cause creepiness or uncanniness.

Arts and entertainment

Music

Musicians
Spooky (house music duo)
Spookey (UK band), a 1970s soul band based in Manchester
DJ Spooky, musician and producer
Spookey Ruben, a singer and musician

Albums
 Spooky (album), by Lush

Songs
 "Spooky"  (Classics IV song), by Mike Sharpe 1966, The Classics IV 1967, Dusty Springfield 1970, and Atlanta Rhythm Section 1979
 "Spooky" (New Order song)
 "Spooky", a song by E-40 from Revenue Retrievin': Graveyard Shift

Fictional characters
Spooky, a ghost that Luigi encounters in the video game Luigi's Mansion
Spooky, of the 2002 video game Pac-Man World 2
Spooky, the nickname of Fox Mulder, of the X-Files television series and movie
Spooky the Tuff Little Ghost, a Harvey Comics character and cousin of Casper the Friendly Ghost

Other uses in arts and entertainment
Spooky, a secondary comic strip accompanying Smokey Stover in Sunday newspapers

Gunships
Spooky, a variant of the Lockheed AC-130, employed in the Vietnam War
Douglas AC-47 Spooky, used by the United States Air Force in the Vietnam War

Other uses
Spooky, a killer whale born in captivity; see List of captive orcas
Spooky, nickname of asteroid  2015 TB145, which passed Earth on Halloween 2015

See also
 Spook (disambiguation)
 Spookies, a 1986 independent horror film